Parañaque's 1st congressional district is one of the two congressional districts of the Philippines in the city of Parañaque. It has been represented in the House of Representatives of the Philippines since 2004. The districts consists of the western Parañaque barangays of Baclaran, Don Galo, La Huerta, San Dionisio, San Isidro, Santo Niño, Tambo and Vitales. It is currently represented in the 19th Congress by Edwin Olivarez of the PDP–Laban.

Representation history

Election results

2022

2019

2016

2013

2010

See also
Legislative districts of Parañaque

References

Congressional districts of the Philippines
Politics of Parañaque
2003 establishments in the Philippines
Congressional districts of Metro Manila
Constituencies established in 2003